The Mount Laurel Formation is a Mesozoic geologic formation located in New Jersey and Delaware. Dinosaur remains diagnostic to the genus level are among the fossils that have been recovered from the formation. Dinosaur teeth recovered from this formation include tyrannosauroid teeth similar to those of Dryptosaurus, as well as teeth from a ~3-4m saurornitholestine dromaeosaurid.
Other fossils include: Belemnites in the genus Belemnitella, Oysters such as Exogyra and Pycnodonte, and rare mosasaur, turtle, and plesiosaur remains.

See also

 List of dinosaur-bearing rock formations
 List of stratigraphic units with few dinosaur genera

Footnotes

References
 Weishampel, David B.; Dodson, Peter; and Osmólska, Halszka (eds.): The Dinosauria, 2nd, Berkeley: University of California Press. 861 pp. .
 C and D Canal, Fossil Hunting: https://www.fossilguy.com/sites/canal/index.htm

Cretaceous geology of New Jersey
Cretaceous Delaware